Wola Korybutowa may refer to the following locations in Poland:

Wola Korybutowa Pierwsza
Wola Korybutowa Druga
Wola Korybutowa-Kolonia